Pentagram is the first compilation album of the Chilean metal band Pentagram, independently released in Chile in 2000 and, two years later, in The Netherlands as a limited edition LP of 500 copies on vinyl. It was the first album by the group after its last demo, White Hell in 1991, and consists of songs recorded live and in the studio in 1987.

In April 2008, the Chilean edition of Rolling Stone ranked the album as the 47th best album of all time in Chile.

Track listing

CD version

Tracks 1-3 previously released on Demo I and recorded in January 1987, Nacofon Studio, Santiago, Chile.
4 to 6 songs previously released in Demo II and recorded in 1987 in Eym September Studios, Santiago, Chile.
Tracks 7-8 recorded live on November 7, 1987, at Manuel Plaza, Santiago, Chile.

LP version

Credits
 Pentagram
 Bass guitar - Alfredo Peña, Anton Reisenegger (tracks 1-3)
 Drums - Eduardo Topelberg
 Rhythm guitar - Juan Pablo Uribe
 Vocals, lead guitar - Anton Reisenegger

 Other
 Design - Fernando Mujica
 Engineer - Alvaro Leon (tracks 1-6)
 Remastering (digital edition) - Cristian Rodríguez

2000 albums
Pentagram (band) albums